The Alfa Romeo C42 is a Formula One car designed and built by Alfa Romeo to compete in the 2022 Formula One World Championship. The C42 is built to the new generation of technical regulations, originally intended for introduction in 2021.

The car was driven by former Mercedes driver Valtteri Bottas and rookie Zhou Guanyu.

Background

Development context 

The new generation of technical regulations were intended to be introduced in the  season. However, due to the disruption of the COVID-19 pandemic, the regulations were delayed until 2022. Development of all new generation cars was thus paused from 28 March 2020 until 31 December 2020.

Naming 
The C42 follows the C41, which in turn follows the C39. The new-generation car had been internally allocated the designation C40 in anticipation of new regulations for the 2021 season. When these were delayed because of the COVID-19 pandemic, a new car, the C41, had to be developed based on the C39 for the interim regulations. However, ahead of the car's unveiling, Alfa Romeo stated that the car would not carry the C40 but instead carry the C42 designation to avoid the sequence of C39, C41, C40, which could have been confusing.

Initial design and development 
Bottas commented that the early version of the C42 ran on the Alfa Romeo simulator did not handle significantly differently to the 2021 cars.

Alfa Romeo used push-rod suspension on both the front and rear, in contrast to the push-rod front and pull-rod rear that had become standard in the turbo-hybrid era. The C42 has the shortest wheelbase of any 2022 car. It packages its Ferrari engine much the same as the works team, with wide sidepods featuring cooling louvres over the top. Alfa Romeo developed several major components in-house rather than sourcing them from Ferrari as it and its predecessor team Sauber had done since Sauber became a Ferrari customer team in 2010. These parts include the fuel tank, rear suspension, and exterior structure of the gearbox (the interior components of the gearbox are still Ferrari-sourced). Technical Director Jan Monchaux listed Formula One's new budget regulations and greater engineering freedom and independence as reasons why Alfa Romeo decided to design these components independently. 

Competition and development history 

The car proved to immediately be more competitive than its predecessors, as the team took a double-points on the car's debut in Bahrain. The result of P6 (Bottas) was the team's highest finish in a race since 2019. The strong start was followed by subsequent points finishes for Bottas in Australia, Imola, Miami, Spain, and Monaco, and then another double-points finish in Canada. This was aided by a substantial upgrade to the C42 at the Emilia Romagna Grand Prix. The upgrade features a new floor edge and strake design as well as a new sidepods that merge with the floor. Changes were also made to the rear brake ducts. The car did suffer from reliability issues, both in testing and at the races, with Bottas retiring in Saudi Arabia while running in the points, as well Zhou retiring with mechanical problems in Miami, Spain, and Baku. Even when the car did not retire from races, the team was often forced to miss portions of practice due to reliability problems, which often put the team on the back foot in terms of preparation for qualifying and/or the race. The car suffered a distinct loss in competitiveness relative to the field, as the car only picked up one points finish after Canada, courtesy of Zhou's P10 finish at Monza. Aston Martin would later catch up to and finish with the same amount of points as Alfa Romeo in the constructors' championship, but ultimately finished P7 and Alfa Romeo claimed P6 for the first time since 2012 (when the team was competing as Sauber) thanks to the tiebreaker - Bottas' P5 finish at Imola.

Sponsorship and livery 
For the Azerbaijan Grand Prix, to coincide with the launch of the Alfa Romeo Tonale, the two C42s had a special livery, distinguished by the replacement of the red colour on the rear of the vehicle with the Montreal Green.

Complete Formula One results
(key)

References

External links 
 

C42
2022 Formula One season cars